Johann Neumann was an Austrian footballer. He played in eight matches for the Austria national football team from 1911 to 1923, scoring two goals.

References

External links
 

Year of birth missing
Year of death missing
Austrian footballers
Austria international footballers
Place of birth missing
Association footballers not categorized by position